Cimarron Township is a township in Gray County, Kansas, USA.  As of the 2000 census, its population was 2,379.

Geography

Transportation
Cimarron Township contains one airport or landing strip, Cimarron Municipal Airport.

References
 USGS Geographic Names Information System (GNIS)

External links
 US-Counties.com
 City-Data.com

Townships in Gray County, Kansas
Townships in Kansas